Surbhi Tiwari (born 19 October 1980) is an Indian television actress. She has portray Jap tap Vratt, Shree Ganesh Mythology serials very well. She was last seen in Tota Weds Maina, and in the role of Kanchan Kothari in Diya Aur Baati Hum and Do Dil Bandhe Ek Dori Se as Cameo.

Television

References

https://navbharattimes.indiatimes.com/movie-masti/interviews/payal-rohatgi-wedding-in-agra-with-sangram-singh-she-talks-about-lehenga-and-other-plans/articleshow/92569310.cms

External links

1971 births
Living people
Indian television actresses
Indian soap opera actresses
Actresses in Hindi television
21st-century Indian actresses
Actresses from Mumbai